North Mason High School is a public high school located in Belfair, Washington. It was constructed in 1982-1983 as part of North Mason School District and was replaced in fall of 2015 as a 95,000 square foot building for grades 9-12. It is one of two high school in the district.

History
North Mason High School was first constructed in 1982–1983 to house 340 students. By 2015, the school population was between 650 and 700 students, but school construction bonds failed to pass in 2002, 2006, and 2008. A new 120,000 square foot building at the cost of $30 million was finished in 2015 to house the students at double the size of the old school.

Atletics
North Mason High School offers various atletic programs including: Boys Cross Country, Girls Cross Country, Football, Cheer, Girls Soccer, Boys Tennis, Girls Volleyball, Boys Basketball, Girls Basketball, Girls Bowling, Boys/Girls Wrestling, Boys Baseball, Girls Fastpitch, Boys/Girls Golf, Boys Soccer, Girls Softball, Girls Tennis, and Boys/Girls Track.

Demographics
In the 2021-2022 school year, 52.5% of the students at NMHS were male, 47.2% were female, and 0.3% were Gender X. 1.5% were Native American, 1.5% were Asian, 0.7% were Native Hawaiian/Other Pacific Islander, 24.9% were Hispanic/Latino, 1.0% were Black, 64.6% were White, and 5.7% were Two or More Races.

References

High schools in Mason County, Washington
Educational institutions established in 1982
Public high schools in Washington (state)
1982 establishments in Washington (state)